Protein VAC14 homolog, also known as ArPIKfyve (Associated Regulator of PIKfyve), is a protein that in humans is encoded by the VAC14 gene.

Functions and interactions 

The content of phosphatidylinositol 3,5-bisphosphate (PtdIns(3,5)P2) in endosomal membranes changes dynamically with fission and fusion events that generate or absorb intracellular transport vesicles. The ArPIKfyve protein scaffolds a trimolecular complex to tightly regulate the level of PtdIns(3,5)P2. Other components of this complex are the PtdIns(3,5)P2-synthesizing enzyme PIKFYVE  and the Sac1-domain-containing PtdIns(3,5)P2 5-phosphatase Sac3, encoded by the human gene FIG4. VAC14 functions as an activator of PIKFYVE. Studies in VAC14 knockout mice indicate that, in addition to increasing the PtdIns(3,5)P2-producing activity of PIKfyve, VAC14 also controls the steady-state levels of another rare phosphoinositide linked to PIKfyve enzyme activity – phosphatidylinositol 5-phosphate.

In addition to the formation of the ternary complex with PIKfyve and Sac3, ArPIKfyve is engaged in a number of other interactions. ArPIKfyve forms a stable complex with the PtdIns(3,5)P2-specific phosphatase Sac3, thereby protecting Sac3 from rapid degradation in the proteasome. ArPIKfyve forms a homooligomer through its carboxyl terminus. However, the number of monomers in the ArPIKfyve homooligomer, ArPIKfyve-Sac3 heterodimer or  PIKfyve-ArPIKfyve-Sac3 heterotrimer is unknown. Human Vac14/ArPIKfyve also interacts with the PDZ (post-synaptic density) domain of neuronal nitric oxide synthase  but the functional significance of this interaction is still unclear. ArPIKfyve facilitates insulin-regulated GLUT4 translocation to the cell surface.

Mouse models 

VAC14 knock-out mice die at, or shortly after birth and exhibit massive neurodegeneration. Fibroblasts from these mice display ~50% lower levels of PtdIns(3,5)P2 and PtdIns(5)P. A spontaneous mouse VAC14-point  mutation (with arginine substitution of leucine156)  is associated with reduced life span (up to 3 weeks),  body size,   enlarged brain ventricles, 50% decrease in PtdIns(3,5)P2 levels, diluted pigmentation,  tremor and impaired motor function.

VAC14 and human disease 

The VAC14 gene has been linked to human disease.

References

Further reading